The Russian records in swimming are the fastest ever performances of swimmers from Russia, which are recognised and ratified by the Russian Swimming Federation (Всероссийская федерация плавания).
 
All records were set in finals unless noted otherwise.

Long course (50 m)

Men

Women

Mixed relay

Short course (25 m)

Men

Women

Mixed relay

References
General
Russian Records  25 July 2022 updated
Specific

External links
All Russian Swimming Federation 

Russia
Records
Swimming
Swimming